Colaphellus is a genus of Chrysomelinae (a subfamily of leaf beetles).

Species
The genus contains the following species:
 Colaphellus alpicola (Warchałowski, 2004)
 Colaphellus apicalis (Ménétriés, 1849)
 Colaphellus bowringi (Baly, 1865)
 Colaphellus foveolatus (Gebler, 1848)
 Colaphellus jakutus Machatschke, 1954
 Colaphellus joliveti Bechyné, 1954
 Colaphellus nitidicollis (Weise, 1889)
 Colaphellus palaestinus (Achard, 1923)
 Colaphellus pulchellus (H. Lucas, 1846)
 Colaphellus pulchellus arabicus (Medvedev, 1996)
 Colaphellus pulchellus pulchellus (H. Lucas, 1846)
 Colaphellus sophiae (Schaller, 1783)
 Colaphellus sophiae amasiae Machatschke, 1954
 Colaphellus sophiae hoefti (Ménétriés, 1832)
 Colaphellus sophiae sophiae (Schaller, 1783)
 Colaphellus sophiae transsylvanicus Machatschke, 1954
 Colaphellus tenuipes (Weise, 1883)
 Colaphellus zarudnyi Medvedev, 1973

References

Chrysomelidae genera
Chrysomelinae
Taxa named by Julius Weise